Jean Catherine Potts (November 17, 1910 – November 10, 1999) was an American award-winning mystery novelist.

Early life
Potts was born in St. Paul, Nebraska, graduated from St. Paul High School, studied at the Denver Women's College, and graduated from Nebraska Wesleyan University.

Career
Potts worked as a journalist in St. Paul before moving to New York where she continued her writing. Her stories appeared in various magazines including Ellery Queen, Alfred Hitchcock's Mystery Magazine, and Woman's Day.

She died in New York in 1999.

Works
Among Potts' published writings are:
(1954) 
(1955) 
(1957) 
(1962) 
(1965) 
(1966) 
(1968)

Awards
Potts won the 1954 Edgar Award for Best First Novel for Go, Lovely Rose, and an Edgar Award nomination for The Evil Wish.

See also
Margaret Millar
Charlotte Armstrong

References

1910 births
1999 deaths
20th-century American women writers
Novelists from Nebraska
20th-century American novelists
American mystery novelists
People from St. Paul, Nebraska
Edgar Award winners
Nebraska Wesleyan University alumni